Wiggly Waffle was a television program produced by The Wiggles Pty Ltd that aired from August 24, 2009 to September 22, 2015.

Wiggly Waffle debuted in the United States on Sprout on December 4, 2009, screening at 10:00am to 11:00am. This version lasted until September 1, 2014. The block aired on Sprout in the United States every weekday from 6:00-9:00 am.

Hosts
The Wiggles are the host of the morning block. They tell jokes, sing songs and play games.

Viewers used to go on the website and send in videos for JB. The jukebox played during the show.

JB also introduced the "5th Wiggle" were viewers can sing and dance with The Wiggles.

Programming
 Barney & Friends
 Thomas & Friends
 Play with Me Sesame
 The Wiggles
 The Mighty Jungle
 Roary the Racing Car
 Monkey See, Monkey Do 
 Chloe's Closet
 Rubbadubbers
 Bob the Builder
 LazyTown

References

External links

The Wiggles
Television programming blocks in Australia
Television programming blocks in the United States
American television shows featuring puppetry
Preschool education television networks
Australian Broadcasting Corporation original programming
Universal Kids original programming